George Washington Dunlap (February 22, 1813 – June 6, 1880) was a U.S. Representative from Kentucky.

Born at Walnut Hills, near Lexington, Kentucky, Dunlap pursued preparatory studies.
He was graduated from Transylvania University, Lexington, Kentucky, in 1834.
He studied law. He was admitted to the bar and commenced practice in Lancaster, Kentucky.

He served as commissioner of the circuit court 1843–1874.
He served as member of the Kentucky House of Representatives in 1853.

Dunlap was elected as a Unionist to the Thirty-seventh Congress (March 4, 1861 – March 3, 1863).  He served as chairman of the Committee on Expenditures in the Department of the Navy (Thirty-seventh Congress).

He served as member of the Border State Convention in 1861.
He was one of the managers appointed by the House of Representatives in 1862 to conduct the impeachment proceedings against West H. Humphreys, United States judge for the several districts of Tennessee.

He resumed the practice of law.

Eugenia Dunlap Potts, who became a historian, was his daughter. He died in Lancaster, Kentucky, on June 6, 1880.
He was interred in Lancaster Cemetery.

References

1813 births
1880 deaths
People from Fayette County, Kentucky
Unionist Party members of the United States House of Representatives from Kentucky
Members of the Kentucky House of Representatives
Kentucky lawyers
Kentucky Unionists
People from Lancaster, Kentucky
Transylvania University alumni
19th-century American politicians
19th-century American lawyers
Members of the United States House of Representatives from Kentucky